This article details the Warrington Wolves Rugby League Football Club's 2018 season. This is the Wolves' 23rd consecutive season in the Super League.

Fixtures and results

Pre-season fixtures and results

Betfred Super League fixtures and results

Betfred Super League Super 8's fixtures and results

Betfred Super League Play Offs

Ladbrokes Challenge Cup

Transfers

In

Out

References

External links
Warrington Wolves Website
Warrington Wolves - SL Website

Warrington Wolves seasons
Super League XXIII by club